Husøy is a populated island in Tønsberg municipality, Norway. It is connected by bridge to its western neighbor Føynland, which in turn is connected to Nøtterøy.

Villages in Vestfold og Telemark
Tønsberg
Islands of Vestfold og Telemark